KFMO (1240 AM, "AM 1240 KFMO") is an American radio station licensed to serve the community of Flat River, Missouri.  The station's broadcast license is held by Odle Media Group.

The station, established in 1947, was assigned the call sign "KFMO" by the Federal Communications Commission (FCC).

KFMO 1240 was established by Oscar Hersch, KFMO was the first radio station in St. Francois County. Jim and Virginia Collins managed the station for more than 20 years.

Programming
KFMO broadcasts a news/talk format. , local weekday programming includes The Morning Drive with Mike Ramsey, a daily tradio program called Swap and Shop, and The Drive Home with Matt McClain. Syndicated programming includes talk shows hosted by Sean Hannity, and Dave Ramsey plus CBS Sports Radio sports talk programming all night.

In March of 2021 the station rebranded itself as the "Parklands Freedom Leader," adding more news/talk programming to replace CBS Sports Radio.  Syndicated programs including talk shows hosted by Mark Levin, Glenn Beck, Ben Shapiro, and Bill O'Reilly were all added to the station's on air lineup.

References

External links
KFMO official website

FMO
News and talk radio stations in the United States
Sports radio stations in the United States
Radio stations established in 1947
St. Francois County, Missouri
CBS Sports Radio stations
1947 establishments in Missouri